Leoti, pronounced "Lee-OH-Tuh." is a city in and the county seat of Wichita County, Kansas, United States.  As of the 2020 census, the population of the city was 1,475.

History 
Leoti was founded in 1885 by a company of men from Garden City, Kansas.  Two years later, in 1887, it was involved in the bloodiest county seat fight in the history of the American West. The shoot-out was on February 27, 1887, when men—some would say hired gunmen—from Leoti, went to the neighboring, rival town of Coronado and left several people dead and wounded. A small town called Farmer City which was located between Coronado and Leoti, was hoped by some to become the county seat—which would end the fighting. Leoti later won the right to become the county seat and now the two other towns consist mainly of farmland. 

The origin of the name Leoti is disputed: one tradition says the name is an Indian term for "prairie flower"; another says the community was named for settler Leoti Kibbee; a third says it was named for Leoti Gray, the daughter of a town founder.

Geography
Leoti is located at  (38.484073, -101.357639).

Climate
According to the Köppen Climate Classification system, Leoti has a semi-arid climate, abbreviated "BSk" on climate maps.

Demographics

2010 census
As of the census of 2010, there were 1,534 people, 607 households, and 419 families residing in the city. The racial makeup of the city was 85.8% White, 0.7% African American, 0.6% Native American, 0.1% Asian, 10.8% from other races, and 2.1% from two or more races. Hispanic or Latino of any race were 31.6% of the population.

There were 607 households, of which 35.4% had children under the age of 18 living with them, 55.7% were married couples living together, 8.2% had a female householder with no husband present, 5.1% had a male householder with no wife present, and 31.0% were non-families. 28.5% of all households were made up of individuals, and 14% had someone living alone who was 65 years of age or older. The average household size was 2.48 and the average family size was 3.05.

The median age in the city was 37.4 years. 29.1% of residents were under the age of 18; 5% were between the ages of 18 and 24; 24.6% were from 25 to 44; 23.6% were from 45 to 64; and 17.7% were 65 years of age or older. The gender makeup of the city was 49.7% male and 50.3% female.

2000 census
As of the census of 2000, there were 1,598 people, 634 households, and 452 families residing in the city. The racial makeup of the city was 81.35% White, 0.06% African American, 0.50% Native American, 0.06% Asian, 15.33% from other races, and 2.69% from two or more races. Hispanic or Latino of any race were 26.03% of the population.

There were 634 households, out of which 34.1% had children under the age of 18 living with them, 59.5% were married couples living together, 7.3% had a female householder with no husband present, and 28.7% were non-families. 27.6% of all households were made up of individuals, and 13.1% had someone living alone who was 65 years of age or older. The average household size was 2.48 and the average family size was 3.02.

In the city, the population was spread out, with 27.7% under the age of 18, 7.9% from 18 to 24, 25.0% from 25 to 44, 21.0% from 45 to 64, and 18.5% who were 65 years of age or older. The median age was 36 years. For every 100 females, there were 98.3 males. For every 100 females age 18 and over, there were 96.9 males.

The median income for a household in the city was $32,596, and the median income for a family was $41,484. Males had a median income of $27,235 versus $17,986 for females. The per capita income for the city was $16,550. About 8.8% of families and 12.0% of the population were below the poverty line, including 16.8% of those under age 18 and 6.0% of those age 65 or over.

Education
Leoti is home to USD 467 Wichita County Schools. The Wichita County High School mascot is Wichita County Indians.

Prior to school unification, Leoti High School also used the Indians mascot.

Notable people
 Ben Diggins, baseball player.
 Steve Tasker, football player (retired), sportscaster.
 Marion Charles Bonner, paleontologist, fossil collector.

References

Further reading

External links

 City of Leoti
 Leoti - Directory of Public Officials
 Wichita County 
 Wichita County Museum
 USD 467 school district
 Leoti City Map, KDOT

Cities in Kansas
County seats in Kansas
Cities in Wichita County, Kansas
1885 establishments in Kansas
Populated places established in 1885